Bir Shikargah Wildlife Sanctuary is situated in Panchkula district of Haryana state, India. It also houses Vulture Conservation and Breeding Centre, Pinjore.

Location
Forests Department, Haryana of Government of Haryana officially notified this as Wildlife Sanctuary 29 May 1987.

Eco-sensitive zone of sanctuary
In 2009, the Government of India declared it an Eco-sensitive Zone (ESZ), as a result development will not be permitted within a  radius.

Area

Animals

Bir Shikargah Wildlife Sanctuary and Khol Hi-Raitan Wildlife Sanctuary are only  aerial distance from each other, both are also only few km away from Kalesar National Park, all of which lie in the Shivalik hills of Haryana. All these three sanctuaries have similar species of wild animal
that migrate from one sanctuary to another. The wild species include Indian leopard, Asiatic elephant, Chital (spotted deer), Sambar deer, Wild boar, Rhesus macaque, Gray langur, Striped hyena, Indian jackal, Jungle cat, Indian gray mongoose, Indian fox and Indian jackal.

Nearby attractions
 Kalesar National Park (Map) -  from Yamunanagar on Chhachhrauli road. It has elephant, wild boar, sambar deer, hare, red junglefowl, porcupine, monkey and chital.

See also
 List of National Parks & Wildlife Sanctuaries of Haryana, India
 Haryana Tourism
 List of Monuments of National Importance in Haryana
 List of State Protected Monuments in Haryana
 List of Indus Valley Civilization sites in Haryana, Punjab, Rajasthan, Gujarat, India & Pakistan
 Kalesar National Park,  from Yamunanagar (Map)
 Sultanpur National Park,  from Gurgaon on Chhachhrauli road (Map)	
 Saraswati Wildlife Sanctuary,  from Pehowa (Map)

References

Wildlife sanctuaries in Haryana
Tourist attractions in Panchkula district
Protected areas with year of establishment missing